The Barse is a  long river in the Aube department in north-east central France. Its source is under the château, in Vendeuvre-sur-Barse. It flows generally west. It is a right tributary of the Seine into which it flows at Saint-Parres-aux-Tertres, near Troyes.

Communes along its course
This list is ordered from source to mouth: Vendeuvre-sur-Barse, Champ-sur-Barse, La Villeneuve-au-Chêne, Briel-sur-Barse, Montreuil-sur-Barse, Montiéramey, Lusigny-sur-Barse, Courteranges, Montaulin, Ruvigny, Rouilly-Saint-Loup, Saint-Parres-aux-Tertres

References

Rivers of France
Rivers of Aube
Rivers of Grand Est